Chiquititas: rincón de luz is a 2001  Argentine fantasy-adventure film directed by José Luis Massa and written by Alex Ferrara and Walter Ferrara. Based on the television series of same name which began on Argentine television in 1995. The film was released in Argentina on 12 July 2001, and is produced by Cris Morena, creator of Chiquititas original television series. Starring Romina Yan, Facundo Arana, Camila Bordonaba, Felipe Colombo, Benjamín Rojas, Luisana Lopilato, Nadia Di Cello, Milagros Flores, Agustín Sierra, Natalia Melcon, Sebastián Francini, Federico Barón and Brian Vainberg. The antagonists were Juan Leyrado and  Alejandra Flechner.

Plot 
It tells the life of some orphans who are forced to work on a farm run by Colonel Francisco Estévez (Juan Leyrado) and also by Marga Calvo (Alejandra Flechner). Until Belén Fraga (Romina Yan) comes across the book that Tok (Brian Vainberg) and the Old Wise Man recommended to her, Belén meets Alejo Méndez Ayala (Facundo Arana) who lives with a boy named Felipe Mejía (Felipe Colombo). But the colonel was interested in a cave that contained very expensive diamonds until in the end the diamonds are from Belén. It is a story full of magic and songs.

Cast

Protagonists 
 Romina Yan as Belén Fraga
 Facundo Arana as Alejo Méndez Ayala

Main Cast 
 Camila Bordonaba as Camila Bustillo
 Benjamín Rojas as Bautista Arce
 Luisana Lopilato as Luisana Maza
 Felipe Colombo as Felipe Mejía
 Sebastián Francini as Sebastián Mansilla
 Nadia Di Cello as María Fernández
 Milagros Flores as Juana Maza
 Agustín Sierra as Agustín Maza
 Natalia Melcon as Natalia Ramos Pacheco Acevedo
 Federico Barón as Federico Martínez
 Cristian Belgrano as Cristián Maza
 Brian Vainberg as Tok

Antagonists 
 Juan Leyrado as Coronel Francisco Estévez
 Alejandra Flechner as Marga Calvo

Participations 
 Roberto Carnaghi as Mayor
 Franklin Caicedo as Old Wise Man
 Gilda Gentile as Gypsy
 Lelio Lesser as Man in town
 Alejandra Perlusky as Fish Saleswoman
 Gustavo Pastorini as Conejero
 Carlos Kaspar as Huevero

Production 
The first plans of a Chiquititas film began four years before the start of this production. The project was supposed to be made for the Brazilian audience but ideas later dropped out.

The movie was shot in 2000 in Villa La Angostura.

Music 
Chiquititas: rincón de luz features, in addition to the television show's cast, the songs that became a hit with the Chiquititas Argentine young audience, such as "Pimpollo", "Había una vez", "Penitas", and the main title song that featured in Chiquititas show's third season, "Rinconcito de luz".

The actress Camila Bordonaba and the actor Felipe Colombo sang the song "Pimpollo" in Hebrew for the Israel play Katantanot based on the film Chiquititas: rincón de luz

Reception
The Chiquititas feature film was not screened for critics, as it was basically a result of the huge success among children from Argentina and other countries, like Israel. However, it received mixed to negative reviews. Reviewers stated that rincón de luz presented typical elements from famous American musical/fantasy films (which Cris Morena herself enjoys) such as The Sound of Music and The NeverEnding Story. The film received a positive review from Argentine newspaper La Nación.

The film was a huge success at the Israeli box office, and was adapted into a musical production in the country. Actors Sebastián Francini and Nadia Di Cello were featured in a presentation.

External links

References

2001 films
2000s Spanish-language films
2000s fantasy adventure films
Chiquititas
Argentine fantasy adventure films
2000s Argentine films